Kielno  is a village in the administrative district of Gmina Szemud, within Wejherowo County, Pomeranian Voivodeship, in northern Poland. It is located within the historic region of Pomerania.

Kielno was initially probably named Kolno. Kielno was a royal village of the Polish Crown, administratively located in the Gdańsk County in the Pomeranian Voivodeship. The local parish priest Zygmunt Niwicki was the royal secretary of 17th-century Polish kings.

The village has a population of 1,025.

Here was born a Kashubian poet Alojzy Nagel.

References

Kielno